Jan Dufek (born 20 February 1997) is a Czech ice hockey forward currently playing for HC Litvínov of the Czech Extraliga.

References

External links
 

1997 births
Living people
HC Litvínov players
Czech ice hockey forwards
Sherbrooke Phoenix players
Blainville-Boisbriand Armada players
Ice hockey people from Brno
PSG Berani Zlín players
HC Kometa Brno players
HC Plzeň players
BK Mladá Boleslav players
HC Most players
Sportovní Klub Kadaň players